Motuloa is an islet on the east side of Nukufetau atoll, Tuvalu.

References

Islands of Tuvalu
Pacific islands claimed under the Guano Islands Act
Nukufetau